Ludwig van Beethoven wrote two rondos for solo piano in 1797:

 Rondo in C major, Op. 51, No. 1
 Rondo in G major, Op. 51, No. 2 

The second rondo bears a dedication to Countess Henriette von Lichnowsky in later editions. Artaria originally published both Rondos without dedications in October 1797. During this time, the composer also wrote the Rondo "Rage Over a Lost Penny" (which was published only posthumously as Op. 129), and the three Piano Sonatas, Op. 10.

References

External links 
 
European Archive Copyright free LP recording of the two Rondo’s 51 by Hugo Steurer, piano at the European Archive (for non-American viewers only).

Piano solos by Ludwig van Beethoven
1797 compositions
Compositions in C major
Compositions in G major